The Indiana Court of Appeals is the intermediate-level appellate court for the state of Indiana. It is the successor to the Indiana Appellate Court.

History
The Indiana Appellate Court was created by the Indiana General Assembly by statute in 1891. It was originally created to be a temporary appellate court to handle overflow cases from the Indiana Supreme Court. The Appellate Court was not intended to be a permanent institution; the original statute specified that it would only exist for six years. But in 1897, the General Assembly voted to keep the court for another four years (due to the Supreme Court's increasing caseload), and then voted to make it permanent in 1901. It was at this point that the court began its function as an intermediate appellate court.

In 1970, the Constitution of Indiana was amended to create the current Indiana Court of Appeals.  The court began hearing cases on January 1, 1972.

Jurisdiction
The Court of Appeals hears appeals from the Indiana trial courts, including some interlocutory appeals.  It also handles appeals from some state government agencies, such as the Worker's Compensation Board, Department of Workforce Development, and Utility Regulatory Commission.  Though the Court of Appeals judges represent different districts within Indiana, each panel of judges has statewide jurisdiction.

Judges
The court was originally created with nine judges: one three-judge panel for each of three districts.  The court was later expanded to fifteen judges (five districts, each with one three judge panel).

Sitting judges 
Names in bold are the presiding judges of their district, while italic font is used to designate the court's chief judge.

See also

Indiana Supreme Court
Government of Indiana
Courts of Indiana

References

External links
 Court of Appeals of Indiana

Indiana state courts
State appellate courts of the United States
1972 establishments in Indiana
Courts and tribunals established in 1972